The Frontier Boys is a 2011 independent action drama film written and directed by John Grooters, with appearances by Contemporary Christian music artist Rebecca St. James and country music singer Big Kenny.

Plot
Four high-school friends in the small town of Charlevoix, Michigan find their basketball season disrupted when a drug dealer moves to town. Brent Fencett (Timothy Lofing) becomes a witness to the drive-by shooting of T.J. Lewis (Taylor DeRoo), the high school's basketball star. As witness, Brent must decide whether or not to give up his own brother to the police or protect him from the consequences. Meanwhile, Brent's good friend Jed Bracken (Jedidiah Grooters) attempts to uncover the truth behind the shooting - not realizing that his best friend has all the answers.

Partial cast
 Rebecca St. James as Judy Bracken 
 Big Kenny Alphin as Kevin Bracken 
 Earthquake Kelley as Reverend Lewis 
 Timothy Lofing as Brent Fencett 
 Jedidiah Grooters as Jed Bracken 
 Jake Boyce as Jackson Carlson 
 Taylor DeRoo as T.J. Lewis 
 Gregory Myhre as Mike Fencett 
 Rodney Wiseman as Sean O'Sullivan
 Alex Lutz as Elk Rapids Basketball Player
 Marguerite Bolt as Charlevoix Cheerleader

Production
The film was based upon a novel written by John Grooters and post-production was done entirely in Holland, Michigan, by his Michigan-based company Grooters Productions. Filming began in February 2010 with the use of local talent, and many scenes were shot in the producer's home town of Charlevoix, Michigan, with one historic home specifically razed by fire for an action sequence in the film. The film premiered on February 18, 2011, in Grand Rapids at "Celebration! Cinema North".

Soundtrack
The soundtrack contains music from popular musicians Switchfoot, Rebecca St. James, Big Kenny, and Superchick.

Distribution
The film debuted at the Michigan Film Festival in November 2010 and began limited theater release in February 2011. The film is being distributed by Ferocious Films as their first feature film release.

Reception
In a review of the film, The Dove Foundation in describing the temptations available to high school students, called it a "powerful drama" and a "compelling story".

The Frontier Boys won the People's Choice Award at the Sabaoth International Film Festival in March 2011.

References

External links
 
 

American action drama films
2011 action drama films
Films shot in Michigan
2010s English-language films
2010s American films